Lee may refer to:

Arts and entertainment 
 Lee (2007 film)
 Lee (2017 film)
 Lee (novel), by Tito Perdue
 "Lee", a 1973 single by The Detroit Emeralds

Businesses

Finance 
Thomas H. Lee Partners, an American private equity firm founded in 1974
 Lee Equity Partners, a breakaway firm founded in 2006

Manufacturers 
 Lee Tires, a division of Goodyear
Lee Filters, a maker of lighting filters

Other businesses
 Lee (jeans), an American clothing brand
 Lee Enterprises, an American media company (NYSE: LEE)

Education 
 Lee College, Bayton, Texas, United States
 Lee University, Cleveland, Tennessee, US

Meteorology 
 Tropical Storm Lee (2011), affecting the Southeastern United States
 Lee wave, atmospheric oscillations as the wind moves over mountains

Names

Given name 
 Lee (given name), a given name in English

Surname 
 Chinese surnames romanized as Li or Lee:
 Li (surname 李) or Lee (Hanzi ), a common Chinese surname
 Li (surname 利) or Lee (Hanzi ), a Chinese surname
Lý (Vietnamese surname) or Lí (李), a common Vietnamese surname
 Lee (Korean surname) or Rhee or Yi (Hanja , Hangul  or ), a common Korean surname 
 Lee (English surname), a common English surname
 List of people with surname Lee
List of people with surname Li
 List of people with the Korean family name Lee

Places

United Kingdom 
 Lee, Devon
 Lee, Hampshire
 Lee, London
 Lee, Mull, a location in Argyll and Bute
 Lee, Northumberland, a location
 Lee, Shropshire, a location
 Lee-on-the-Solent, Hampshire
 Lee District (Metropolis)
 The Lee, Buckinghamshire, parish and village name, formally known as Lee
  River Lee — alternative name for River Lea

United States 

 Lee, California
 Lee, Florida
 Lee, Illinois
 Lee, Indiana
 Lee, Maine
 Lee, Massachusetts, a New England town
 Lee (CDP), Massachusetts, the central village in the town
 Lee, Nevada
 Lee, New Hampshire
 Lee, New York, a town
 Lee (hamlet), New York, within the town of Lee
 Lees Station, Tennessee, also called Lee
 Lee Peak, in Missouri
 Mount Lee, in California
 Van Aken–Lee (RTA Rapid Transit station) (signed "Lee – Van Aken"), a station on the RTA Blue Line in Cleveland, Ohio

Elsewhere 
 Lée, southwestern France
 Lee, Uttarakhand, India
 Electoral district of Lee, in South Australia
 River Lee, in Ireland
 Lee (Vechte), a river in Germany

Vehicles 
 Lee side, a ship or boat's downwind side
 M3 Lee, an American WWII tank

See also
 LEA (disambiguation)
 Leah (disambiguation)
 Le (disambiguation)
 LEE (disambiguation)
 Lees (disambiguation)
 Lee's (disambiguation)
 Leigh (disambiguation)
 Li (disambiguation)
 Ly (disambiguation)
 Justice Lee (disambiguation)